Sigurd Njerve (born 12 September 1971) is a former Norwegian triple jumper. He represented IL Norna-Salhus.
 
He finished tenth at the 1996 European Indoor Championships in Stockholm and seventh at the 1997 IAAF World Indoor Championships in Paris. Participating at the 1996 Summer Olympics, he did not manage to reach the final. He became Norwegian champion in 1995, 1996 and 2000.

His personal best jump was 17.01 metres, achieved in June 1996 in Helsinki. This places him second on the Norwegian all-time performers list, only behind Ketill Hanstveit.

Achievements

References

1971 births
Living people
Norwegian male triple jumpers
Athletes (track and field) at the 1996 Summer Olympics
Olympic athletes of Norway